Gregory Levey (born c. 1978) is a Canadian writer and entrepreneur.  He is Associate Professor of professional communication at Toronto Metropolitan University, co-founder of the software company Figure 1, a journalist and an author.

Career
Levey was a young law student at Fordham University in  New York City when he was hired in 2004 as a speechwriter for the Israeli Delegation to the United Nations and then was a writer of speeches for an Anglophone audience for Israeli Prime Minister Ariel Sharon until 2006. He worked for some years as a journalist and freelance writer, then became a professor of communication at Ryerson University (now Toronto Metropolitan University) and co-foundered the software company Figure 1.

Levey's "controversial and much-discussed" 2009 magazine article, "Lament for the iGeneration", caused a stir with its assertion that a generation of students, the iGeneration, brought up on online, lack the skills and capacity to handle a post-secondary education.

Figure 1 (corporation)
Levey co-founded the social media company Figure 1.

Books
Levey's 2008 memoir, Shut Up, I'm Talking: And Other Diplomacy Lessons I Learned in the Israeli Government: A Memoir, recounts his stint as a speech writer at the United Nations. The book recounts how Levey, then a 20-year-old Law student, landed a job as a speechwriter for Prime Minister Ariel Sharon. The book's title went viral on social media.

Levey's second book, How to Make Peace in the Middle East in Six Months or Less: Without Leaving Your Apartment, was a satire of the Middle Eastern peace process.

References

External links
Personal website

1979 births
Living people
Speechwriters
Canadian memoirists
Canadian political writers
Fordham University School of Law alumni
Academic staff of Toronto Metropolitan University
Jewish Canadian writers
Canadian public relations people
Writers from Toronto